is a Japanese sushi restaurant chain. Its headquarters are in Sakai, Osaka Prefecture.

It has 451 locations in Japan, 22 in Taiwan, and 30 in the United States.  While it is a conveyor belt sushi chain, it relies on a high level of automation allowing the average location to function with fifteen to twenty staff members. At Kura Sushi's locations, each of them own a robot known as "KuraB the Kurabot", who delivers things such as food and beverages, however sometimes employees will simply supply the beverages themselves.

History 
Kura Sushi launched its first location in Taiwan in December 2014 near Songjiang Nanjing metro station in Taipei.

Kura Sushi has featured decorations and menu items based on characters such as Sonic the Hedgehog and Hello Kitty. By inserting a certain number of plates into a receptacle, customers can trigger custom animations or win prizes during their dining experience.

Controversy 

Kura Sushi USA has repeatedly been sued for discrimination by former female corporate employee and many more lawsuits. The most recent class action that is still going on in California in 2022 was filed by a group of servers for unpaid overtime, regular wage, uniform and business travel expenses and many other unpaid items.

Response to COVID-19 
During the coronavirus pandemic, the company received $6 million in forgivable loans intended for small businesses from the Paycheck Protection Program. The funds were distributed as part of the government's $2.2 trillion CARES Act and intended to benefit workers at employers with fewer than 500 employees that are unable to obtain credit elsewhere. The loan was returned immediately after criticized.

See also
 List of sushi restaurants

References

External links
Kura USA
Kura Japan 

Restaurant chains in Japan
Sushi restaurants in Japan
Companies listed on the Nasdaq
Companies listed on the Tokyo Stock Exchange
Companies listed on the Taipei Exchange